John O'Neil Farrell (August 28, 1906 – June 20, 1994) was an American speed skater and speed skating coach.

Farrell participated in the 1928 Winter Olympics in St. Moritz. On the 500 m, he skated in the first pair and promptly set a new Olympic record with a time of 43.6 seconds, breaking Charles Jewtraw's old record of 44.0 seconds. The record would not stand, though, because in the next pair, Clas Thunberg skated 43.4 seconds, and in the eighth pair, Bernt Evensen also skated 43.4. But since nobody else besides those two skated faster than 43.6, Farrell won the bronze medal.

At the 1932 Winter Olympics of Lake Placid, the speed skating events were skated in pack-style format (having all competitors skate at the same time) for the only time in Olympic history. Farrell qualified for the final in his heat, but finished in sixth (and last) place in the final. Two weeks later, he finished fourteenth at the 1932 World Allround Championships, also in Lake Placid. At the 1936 Winter Olympics of Garmisch-Partenkirchen, Farrell was the head coach of the American speed skating team.

Farrell was a National Outdoor Champion. In 1971 he was inducted in the National Speedskating Hall of Fame.

References

External links

 John Farrell at SkateResults.com
 Magne Teigen. Evolution of Olympic Records. International Skating Union (2006-03-05). Retrieved on 2007-08-30.

1906 births
1994 deaths
American male speed skaters
Speed skaters at the 1928 Winter Olympics
Speed skaters at the 1932 Winter Olympics
Olympic bronze medalists for the United States in speed skating
Medalists at the 1928 Winter Olympics
Speed skating coaches